The Sporting District was an area near 16th and Harney Streets in Omaha, Nebraska where city boss Tom Dennison kept the majority of his gambling, drinking and prostitution interests from the late 19th century until the end of his reign in 1933. "Cowboy" James Dahlman was reputedly voted to the first of eight terms as mayor of Omaha because he was more tolerant of the Dennison's "Sporting District" in the middle of the city.

The term sporting was a common 19th-century euphemism for gambling and/or prostitution. Many communities around the U.S. used this term; brothels were often referred to as sporting houses.

History
The Burnt District had been Omaha's red-light district in the late 19th century.  The area was located east of Creighton University from Douglas Street six blocks north to Cass Street and from the Missouri River west to Sixteenth Street. The district was closed down around the turn of the century, and business transferred to the Sporting District.

It has been estimated that there were over 100 "houses of questionable character" in 1910. In 1918 the Health Commissioner reported that there were at least 1,600 prostitutes working in the area.

Establishments
There were a variety of venues inside the district. They included the Gayety Theatre, located at 1514 Harney Street, which was a notorious burlesque house that civic organizations protested. The theatre was opened in 1906 as the Burwood Theatre and the name was changed to the Gayety Theatre in 1908. It continued to operate until 1928. Tom Dennison kept his primary office at the Budweiser Saloon in the Sporting District at 1409 Douglas Street, the site of the current Union Pacific Center. The saloon was owned by William E. Nesselhous, one of Dennison's key lieutenants.

Anna Wilson ran a 25-room brothel in a mansion at 915 Douglas Street during this period, along with Dan Allen's gambling house, saloon and pawn shop. Mae Hogan ran a brothel on the corner of 16th and Jackson, and Ada and Minna Everleigh had a brothel at 12th and Jackson before moving to Chicago to open the Everleigh Club.

Another establishment in the Sporting District was the Diamond Gambling House located at 1312 Douglas Street. The "Big Four" Omaha gamblers of 1887, Charles Bibbins, H.B. Kennedy, Charles White and Jack Morrison operated the facility until 1893, when it was closed by the City.

See also
 History of Omaha
 Culture in Omaha
 San Antonio Sporting District
 Storyville

References

Bibliography

External links
 Historic postcard of the Gayety Theatre.

Historic districts in Omaha, Nebraska
Historical red-light districts in the United States
Crime in Omaha, Nebraska
 
History of Downtown Omaha, Nebraska